Persicaria extremiorientalis, the east Asian smartweed, is a plant species in the buckwheat family, native to Japan, China, Korea, and far eastern Russia and introduced to the eastern United States where it is found from North Carolina to Massachusetts.

References

Flora of Asia
extremiorientalis